Rubens Recalcatti (23 October 1948 – 9 April 2021) was a Brazilian politician, lawyer, and policeman. A member of the Social Democratic Party, he served on the Legislative Assembly of Paraná from 2017 until his death in 2021.

Biography
The son of Jacob Recalcatti, Rubens was born in Videira and moved to Francisco Beltrão in his childhood. He moved to Curitiba in the 1970s and graduated from the Pontifical Catholic University of Paraná with a degree in social studies. After earning a law degree from the Centro Universitário Curitiba, he was promoted to homicide detective.

In 2015, Recalcatti was detained by the Rio Branco do Sul prosecutor's office following the death of Ricardo Geffer, the primary suspect in the murder of former mayor , who was Recalcatti's cousin. However, because the suspect's death occurred outside of the Rio Branco do Sul jurisdiction, there was no ongoing investigation into the case. In 2016, he was denounced by the Ministério Público do Paraná for abuse of authority and procedural fraud.

Originally a member of the Green Party, Recalcatti ran for the Legislative Assembly of Paraná in 2010, without success. In the 2014 elections, he was the first alternate for the Social Democratic Party, amassing 40,358 votes. He was re-elected in 2018 with 35,248 votes.

Aside from his political or policing career, he co-wrote the book Sequestro – Modus Operandi e Estudos de Casos with Noely Manfredini, which was published in 2008.

Rubens Recalcatti died of a heart attack in Curitiba on 9 April 2021, at the age of 72.

References

1948 births
2021 deaths
21st-century Brazilian politicians
Members of the Legislative Assembly of Paraná
Social Democratic Party (Brazil, 2011) politicians
Pontifical Catholic University of Paraná alumni
Centro Universitário Curitiba alumni
Brazilian police officers
People from Santa Catarina (state)
People from Paraná (state)